The Mercedes-Benz M104 is a straight-6 automobile engine produced from 1989 through 1999. It has a double overhead cam design with 4 valves per cylinder, and used a crossflow cylinder head. It replaced the M103 and was replaced by the M112 V6 starting in 1997. The M104 continued in production until 1999 where its last use by Mercedes-Benz was in the W140 chassis. The bore spacing on all M104 engines is the same as M103 engines.

2.8 L M104.900

As Mercedes needed a compact 6-cylinder for their Vito, they agreed with Volkswagen to use their VR6 engine, which they then designated M104.900. An agreement was reached and the engines were sold semi-completed to Mercedes-Benz. This version is unrelated to other engines designated M104. Only the engine cover and aircleaner housing is by Mercedes-Benz.

3.0 L M104.98x
This  24v was introduced as a sports car resp. top model completing the line-up of M103 12V engines. The M104 featured dual overhead camshafts and four valves per cylinder. The M103 and M104.98x were later replaced by the 2.8-litre and 3.2-litre versions of the M104.

The  M104 featured KE-Jetronic fuel injection, cylinder specific ignition-timing, variable valve timing and under-piston cooling jets.

Specifications
 Engine power @ 6400 rpm or 6300 (300SL-24):  (without catalytic converter). Only R129 300SL-24 has   version of 3-liter M104 engine.
 Bore and stroke: 
 Compression ratio: 10:1

Applications
 1989–1992 C124 300 CE-24
 1991–1992 A124 300 CE-24
 1989–1993 R129 300 SL-24
 1990–1993 W124 300 E-24 
 1990–1993 S124 300 TE-24
1987—1993 Isdera Spyder 036i 3.0-24V

2.8 L M104.94x
In 1993, two capacities replaced the 3.0 litre: a  replaced the old single-cam M103 engine and the 3.2 litre M104.99x replaced the double-cam M104.98x.

Specifications for 2.8 L
 Engine power @ 5500 rpm:  or 145–148 kW (197 PS; 195 hp/201PS; 199 hp) on SsangYong models 
 Torque @ 3750 rpm:  or 271–277 N·m (199–204 lb·ft) on SsangYong models
 Bore and stroke: 
 
 Lubrication system: pressure circulation
 Oil capacity: 
 Coolant capacity: 
 Camshaft drive: duplex roller chain
 Starter motor: 1.7 kW electrical motor
 Ignition system: ignition mapping control
 
Applications
1993–1997 W202 C 280
1995–1997 W210 E 280
 1992–1993 W124 280 E
 1994–1996 W124 E 280
1993–1998 W140 300 SE 2.8, S 280
1995-1997 R129 SL 280
1997–2004 W124 SsangYong Chairman H CM500S
2003–2006 Y200 SsangYong Rexton I RX 280

3.2 L M104.99x

Specifications
 Engine power @ 5500 rpm:  or 
 Torque @ 3750 rpm:  or 
 Bore and stroke: 
 Compression ratio: 9.2:1 to 10.0:1
 Intake valves: 
 Exhaust valves 
 Starter motor: 1.7 kW electrical motor
 Ignition system: electronic ignition system

Applications
Mercedes-Benz
1993–1994 W124 320 E
1994–1996 W124 E 320
1995–1997 W210 E 320
1991–1993 W140 300 SE, 300 SEL 
1993–1999 W140 S 320
1994–1998 R129 SL 320
1994–1998 W463 G 320
Roewe
2011–2017 W5
2008–2009 R95
SsangYong
1997-2017 Chairman
1996-2006 Korando
2007-2014 Kyron
1993–1999 Musso
2001–2006 Rexton Y200
2004–2013 Rodius
Heuliez
1996 Intruder
Status & Class
1999 OPAC Contender XG

AMG 3.4 (3.3 L)
There were 3.3 L conversions done to the 3.0 L M104.980 by AMG, prior to their formal cooperation with Daimler Benz.

AMG developed a 3.3 L M104 that was used principally in the 300E AMG 3.4, AMG 3.4 CE and 300TE-3.4 AMG (Mercedes-Benz W124) vehicles, produced between 1988-1993. A few of these engines were originally installed in the SL 3.4 AMG.

Specifications for AMG 3.4 (3.3 L)
 Engine power @ 6500 rpm: 
 Torque @ 4500 rpm: 
 Bore and stroke: 
 Lubrication system: pressure circulation
 Oil capacity: 
 Coolant capacity: 
 Starter motor: 1.7 kW electrical motor
 Ignition system: Bosch KE-Jetronic (CIS-E) injection

AMG 3.6 L M104.941/M104.992
There were 3.6 L conversions done to both the M103 and M104 by Brabus, among others.

AMG developed a  M104 that was used in the W202 C36 AMG (W202) from M104.941, the W124 E36 AMG (W124) from M104.992, the E36 AMG (W210), and the G36 AMG (W463) vehicles.

A larger intake crossover pipe, free-flowing exhaust, a unique intake camshaft, minor changes to the cylinder head, and modifications to the HFM fuel computer also contribute to the increase in power.

Chinese car Roewe R95L which based on SsangYong Chairman also uses 3.6 litre version of M104 engine.

Last versions of German sportcar Isdera Spyder 036i after 1990 also uses 3.6 litre AMG variant of M104, producing 268 (200 kW; 272 PS) or 282 hp (210 kW; 286 PS).

Turbo Conversions
Turbocharger kits were offered for both the M103 and M104 engines by Turbo Technics, Mosselman, Lotec, MAD Modify, Turbobandit and other tuners.
During the 1990s UK customers were able to buy new vehicles equipped with a Turbo Technics conversion directly from Mercedes dealer Hughes of Beaconsfield (limited run of 75 conversions). Today turbocharger kits for M103-M104 engines are available from later tuners in Europe and Asia.

References

Notes 

M104
Straight-six engines
Gasoline engines by model